Jamil Alibekov (5 December 1927; Fuzuli, Azerbaijan – 26 October 2014) was an Azerbaijani writer and public figure. He is the author of more than 40 works. For twenty years he worked in responsible positions in the media and he was favorite person among young people. He had travelled to four countries of the continent, and his essays written from the United States, Turkey, United Kingdom, Russia (Siberia), Austria, Iran and others countries that he visited, was cause of the interest.

Biography
Jamil Alibekov (Full name: Jamil Alibekov Adil oglu) was born on 5 December 1927 in Fuzuli district of the Republic  of Azerbaijan.  He graduated from the University of Azerbaijan and began to work in “ Azerbaijan Youth” newspaper in 1949.  He worked in this newspaper for 20 years  in different positions such as a literary worker, head of  department, responsible secretary and chief editor in last two years. 
In 1970 J. Alibekov was appointed to the position assistant chairman of the Committee of Azerbaijan Radio and Television  Programs. He established a lot of favorite programs such as “ Bulaq” during four years when he worked in the television.  In 1974 he was appointed to the position director of film  studio  “ Azerbaijanfilm” .  Films made in his position years were highly appreciated and won awards in the international and national levels. Films such as “"Dede Korkud", "Babek", "Fakir blows Paris" (Dərviş Dərviş Parisi partladır), " Pipe voice" (Tütək səsi), "Investigation" (İstintaq"), " Birthday" (Ad günü), " Mother-in-law"(Qayınana), "Papakh" included into Gold Fund.

Works
 The founders of the city
 First steps
 Labour and heroism
 City creators
 For love
 Your wealth 
 There is my name in four continents
 My motherly world
 In the search of myself
 The first love (novel)
 Winter adventure (novel)
 Nigar`s  dream
 Three sisters

References

External links
 HugeDomains.com
 Mirzə Xəzərin Səsi : „Qızıl at və torpaq“ın müəllifinin 85 yaşı tamam olur. Təbrik edirik, Cəmil müəllim!

1927 births
2014 deaths
Azerbaijani writers
Soviet writers
Translators to Azerbaijani
20th-century translators